William Paul Dillingham (December 12, 1843July 12, 1923) was an American attorney and politician from the state of Vermont. A Republican and the son of Congressman and Governor Paul Dillingham, William P. Dillingham served as governor from 1888 to 1890 and United States Senator from 1900 until his death.

Dillingham was born in Waterbury, Vermont, in 1843, and attended schools in Vermont and New Hampshire. He studied law with his brother in law, Matthew Hale Carpenter, attained admission to the bar, and practiced in Waterbury and Montpelier.

Groomed for a political career from an early age, Dillingham served as Secretary of Civil and Military Affairs (chief assistant to the governor) during his father's term and that of Asahel Peck, State's Attorney of Washington County, and member of the Vermont House of Representatives and Vermont State Senate. He was elected governor in 1888 and served one two-year term.

In 1900, Dillingham won election to the United States Senate, replacing Jonathan Ross, who had been appointed as a temporary replacement following the death of incumbent Justin Smith Morrill. Dillingham served in the Senate until his death, and was chairman of several committees during his tenure. As head of a commission that studied immigration, he argued that southern and eastern European immigrants posed a threat to the country's stability and growth, and that immigration from those areas should be curbed in the future.

Dillingham died in Montpelier in 1923 and was buried at Hope Cemetery in Waterbury.

Early life
The son of Governor Paul Dillingham, William P. Dillingham was born on December 12, 1843 in Waterbury, Vermont.  He attended the public schools, Newbury Seminary in Montpelier, Vermont and Kimball Union Academy in Meriden, New Hampshire. In 1866 he served as Secretary of Civil and Military Affairs (chief assistant) during his father's governorship. He also studied law with his brother in law Matthew H. Carpenter and was admitted to the bar in 1867.

Public service
Dillingham practiced law in Waterbury. A Republican, he served as Washington County State's Attorney from 1872 to 1876. From 1874 to 1876 he was Secretary of Civil and Military Affairs (chief assistant) for Governor Asahel Peck.

In 1876, Dillingham was elected to the Vermont House of Representatives. From 1878 to 1882 he served in the Vermont State Senate.  Dillingham served as Vermont's Commissioner of Taxes from 1882 to 1888, and served another term in the Vermont House in 1884.

In 1888 Dillingham was elected the 42nd Governor of Vermont.  He served the one two-year term available under the Mountain Rule, afterwards returning to the practice of law.  Dillingham practiced in Montpelier with Hiram A. Huse and Fred A. Howland. Howland was Dillingham's nephew, and had studied law with Dillingham to qualify for admission to the bar.

Dillingham was elected to the United States Senate in 1900, replacing temporary appointee Jonathan Ross and completing the term of Justin Smith Morrill, who had died in office. Dillingham was reelected in 1903, 1909, 1914 and 1920, and served until his death. His 1914 election was Vermont's first following passage of the Seventeenth Amendment to the United States Constitution.

During his Senate career Dillingham was Chairman of the following committees: Transportation Routes to the Seaboard (Fifty-seventh Congress); Immigration (Fifty-eighth through Sixty-first Congresses); Privileges and Elections (Sixty-second, Sixty-sixth, and Sixty-seventh Congresses); and Establishing the University of the United States (Sixty-third through Sixty-fifth Congresses).

Dillingham achieved prominence as the leading Progressive-era legislative spokesperson for restricting immigration. From 1907 to 1911, Dillingham chaired (concurrently with his Senate duties) the United States Immigration Commission, also called the Dillingham Commission, which concluded that immigration from southern and eastern Europe posed a serious threat to American society and culture and should be greatly reduced in the future.

In 1903, Dillingham chaired a Senate subcommittee that investigated conditions in Alaska following the Klondike Gold Rush. During their trip, a new courthouse established near the Nushagak River village of Kanakanak was named in honor of the chairman and the surrounding community later adopted the name Dillingham, Alaska. While the subcommittee traveled extensively throughout Alaska, Dillingham never set foot in the Bristol Bay salmon fishing community that still bears his name.

Business and civic endeavors
Dillingham's business interests included serving as President of the Waterbury Savings Bank and a member of the National Life Insurance Company board of directors.

He was active in the Methodist church, and served as President of the Board of Trustees of the Montpelier Seminary (originally the Vermont Methodist Seminary), and a member of the University of Vermont Board of Trustees.

Dillingham was a member of the Sons of the American Revolution, and served as President of the Vermont SAR organization.

Death and burial
Dillingham died in Montpelier on July 12, 1923.  He was buried in Waterbury's Hope Cemetery.

Awards and honors
Dillingham received the following honorary degrees: Master of Arts, University of Vermont (1886); LL.D., Norwich University (1893); LL.D., Middlebury College (1906).

Family
Dillingham lived at 7 West Street in Montpelier while serving in the Senate. His home was owned by Vermont College for more than 50 years, and served as a dormitory and as office space.  Known as Dillingham Hall when it was part of the college, the building is once again a private residence.

On December 24, 1874, William P. Dillingham married Mary Ellen Shipman (November 7, 1846—April 25, 1893).  They had one son, Paul Shipman Dillingham (October 24, 1878—March, 1972).

See also
List of United States Congress members who died in office (1900–49)

References

External links

 
 Dillingham Commission page including a digitized version of the complete set of Dilligham Commission reports. From the Immigration to the United States from 1789 to 1930 collection, Harvard University Library Open Collections Program

1843 births
1923 deaths
People from Montpelier, Vermont
Republican Party governors of Vermont
Republican Party members of the Vermont House of Representatives
American prosecutors
Republican Party United States senators from Vermont
Republican Party Vermont state senators
Vermont lawyers
State's attorneys in Vermont
Burials in Vermont
19th-century American lawyers